Best of Dark Horse 1976–1989 is a compilation album by English musician George Harrison, released in October 1989. His second compilation, after the Capitol/EMI collection The Best of George Harrison (1976), it contains songs from Harrison's releases on his Dark Horse record label between 1976 and 1987. The album also includes a 1989 single, "Cheer Down", which was Harrison's contribution to the soundtrack of the film Lethal Weapon 2, and two tracks recorded specifically for the collection: "Poor Little Girl" and "Cockamamie Business". Despite the popularity of Harrison's work over this period – both as a solo artist with his Cloud Nine album (1987), and as a member of the Traveling Wilburys – the compilation failed to achieve commercial success.

Best of Dark Horse became out of print in the early 1990s, and it remained unavailable when Harrison's Dark Horse catalogue was reissued in 2004. It remains the only official release to include "Poor Little Girl" and "Cockamamie Business".

Background
Rather than record a follow-up to his successful 1987 comeback album, Cloud Nine, in 1989, George Harrison chose to wait for his Traveling Wilburys bandmates – Jeff Lynne, Bob Dylan and Tom Petty – to become available to start work on a new album. As the de facto leader of the Wilburys project, Harrison was the most active member in promoting their 1988 debut, Traveling Wilburys Vol. 1. In a July 1989 interview, he described the album as "one of the most enjoyable things I've done" and added: "I just have to wait for all the other Wilburys to finish being solo artists …" Harrison instead agreed to issue a greatest hits album, covering his work released on his own Dark Horse record label, from 1976's Thirty Three & 1/3 to Cloud Nine.

Album content

Previously released songs
Unlike on The Best of George Harrison (1976), which Capitol Records had compiled after the expiration of his EMI contract, Harrison was involved in the selection of songs for Best of Dark Horse. The compilation includes his hit singles "Crackerbox Palace" (1977), "Blow Away" (1979), "All Those Years Ago" (1981), "Got My Mind Set on You" (1987) and "When We Was Fab" (1988), and two other songs that had placed on one of Billboard magazine's US singles charts: "Love Comes to Everyone" (1979) and "Wake Up My Love" (1982). The new album omitted charting singles such as "This Song" (1976) and "This Is Love" (1988), however. Over these, Harrison favoured a selection of album tracks: "Here Comes the Moon", from 1979's George Harrison album; "Life Itself", from Somewhere in England (1981); "That's the Way It Goes" and "Gone Troppo", from the 1982 album Gone Troppo; and the title track from Cloud Nine, which had charted on Billboards Album Rock Tracks listings.

New recordings
Harrison recorded two new songs for the compilation – "Poor Little Girl" and "Cockamamie Business" – at his Friar Park home studio in July 1989. Also included on Best of Dark Horse 1976–1989 was Harrison's contribution to the soundtrack for the film Lethal Weapon 2, "Cheer Down", which was issued as a single in the United States in August 1989. The latter song was co-written by Petty and co-produced by Lynne. Although Lynne played on "Poor Little Girl" and "Cockamamie Business" also, and the recordings feature a similar sound to his and Harrison's previous collaborations, production for the two songs was credited to Harrison only. While preparing the compilation for release, Harrison contributed various guitar parts to Lynne's debut solo album, Armchair Theatre.

Release

Best of Dark Horse 1976–1989 was released on 17 October 1989 in the United States and 23 October in Britain. The album cover features a photograph of Harrison taken by Terry O'Neill. Harrison dedicated the album to Friends of the Earth, Greenpeace, Parents for Safe Food, the Traveling Wilburys, racing-car designer Gordon Murray, and "anyone interested in saving our planet".

For the UK release of the "Cheer Down" single, which took place on 27 November, "Poor Little Girl" appeared as the B-side. "Poor Little Girl" was issued as a promotional single in the US, containing both the full (4:32) version of the track and a 3:25 edit. The song peaked at number 21 on the national Album Rock Tracks chart.

On release, Best of Dark Horse 1976–1989 failed to chart in the United Kingdom and peaked at number 132 in the United States. The album's lack of commercial success was surprising, given the resurgence in popularity that Harrison had experienced since 1987. Originally distributed through Warner Bros. Records, the compilation went out of print some years later and was not reissued by EMI when that company began distributing Harrison's Dark Horse catalogue. "Poor Little Girl", "Cockamamie Business" and "Cheer Down" were omitted from Harrison's 2004 box set The Dark Horse Years 1976–1992.

Reviewing the album in Christgau's Record Guide: The '80s (1990), Robert Christgau called Harrison "a simpleton, but also a genuine weirdo" whose voice can imitate wah-wah sounds as well as Robert Plant emulates the guitar of Jimmy Page. Christgau added: "And he seems genuinely troubled by evil doings here on the wrong side of the veil of maya, not that there's anything a mere star-in-spite-of-himself can do about it, except write the occasional ditty about playing in a rock and roll band." Writing for Rough Guides in 2006, Chris Ingham described Best of Dark Horse as "excellent" and regretted that the album was no longer available. With The Best of George Harrison the artist's only compilation in print at that time, and "hardly a satisfying one-stop sampler", Ingham continued, "This state of affairs surely can't last much longer." In a 2018 review for Uncut, Peter Watts said that while the 1976–89 period is not widely considered to be the artist's most productive period, "It's a testament to Harrison's talent that he could put together such a strong selection of songs ... and that's without including a couple of charting singles ('This Song', 'This Is Love') or anything by the Traveling Wilburys. Even today, it's the only place you can hear 'Poor Little Girl' and 'Cockamamie Business', making it essential for completists."

Track listing 

The vinyl release omitted "Gone Troppo" and reversed the order of "Crackerbox Palace" and "Cloud 9". "Got My Mind Set on You" closed side one and "Cloud 9" opened side two. The cassette release matched the fifteen-song CD track listing. In this format, "Crackerbox Palace" closed side one and "Cloud 9" opened side two.

Personnel
Musicians on new recordings ("Poor Little Girl" and "Cockamamie Business")

According to Simon Leng:

 George Harrison – vocals, guitars, banjo, backing vocals
 Jeff Lynne – bass, keyboards, backing vocals
 Richard Tandy – piano
 Ray Cooper – percussion
 Ian Paice – drums
 Jim Horn – saxophones, horn arrangements

Technical personnel

Adapted from the credits in the Best of Dark Horse CD booklet:

 Phil McDonald – recording and remix engineering
 Richard Dodd – compilation engineering
 Wherefore Art? – art design
 Terry O'Neill – photography

Chart positions

Sales

References

Sources

 
 
 
 
 

 
 
 
 
 
 
 
 

1989 greatest hits albums
George Harrison compilation albums
Albums produced by George Harrison
Albums produced by Jeff Lynne
Albums produced by Russ Titelman
Dark Horse Records compilation albums
Albums recorded at FPSHOT